The Thames Valley Counties Women's Football League is a women's association football competition in England covering the counties within the Thames Valley region. The League consists of seven adult divisions and two under 18 divisions.

The League is at tier 7 of the women's pyramid. It promotes to the Southern Region Women's Football League Division One, and does not relegate to any league.

The league was null and voided in the 2019–20 season due to the coronavirus pandemic.

Teams
The teams competing during the 2020–21 season are:

Women's - Open Age

Under 18's

External links
 Thames Valley Counties Women's Football League: The FA Full-Time

References

7
Football in Berkshire
Football in Buckinghamshire
Football competitions in London
Football in Oxfordshire
Football in Surrey